Spex or SPEX may refer to:
Variation of specs, colloquial abbreviation of specifications or spectacles

Entertainment 
Spex (magazine), a German magazine
Spex (theatre), a kind of amateur theatre performed by university students in Sweden and Finland

Industry and technology 
Spex Design Corporation, kit car manufacturer
Spex (solar park), a solar park in Spain
SPEX (astronomy), a Dutch space science project

See also
Specs (disambiguation)